Lai Shyh-bao (born 20 June 1951) is a Taiwanese politician. He has served on the Kuomintang Central Standing Committee, the National Assembly and the Legislative Yuan.

Education
He received a bachelor's degree in engineering from National Cheng Kung University, before studying business administration at the National Chengchi University. Lai taught the subject and eventually chaired the Graduate Institute of Business Administration at NCCU. He returned to engineering while as a master's and doctoral student at the University of Southern California.

Political career
From 1999 to 2002, Lai was a New Party legislator. Despite a declaration that he would leave the New Party at the end of 2001 but not join another party, Lai switched affiliations to the Kuomintang in his legislative second term and secured the continued endorsement of the New Party.

Lai was also promoted to increasingly important KMT caucus positions. In April 2005 he was deputy secretary of the caucus. By July, Lai had become caucus whip, a position he held until February 2016. Lai was nominated as the Kuomintang candidate for speaker of the ninth Legislative Yuan. The Democratic Progressive Party held a majority in the legislature, and elected Su Jia-chyuan as President of the Legislative Yuan. In 2020, Lai was again nominated for the speakership, losing for a second time, to Yu Shyi-kun.

Electoral history

2008 legislative election
Eligible voters: 231,411
Total votes cast  (Ratio): 146,614 (63.36%)
Valid Votes  (Ratio): 145,173 (99.02%)
Invalid Votes   (Ratio): 1,441 (0.98%)

References

1951 births
Living people
Taiwanese engineers
National Cheng Kung University alumni
USC Viterbi School of Engineering alumni
National Chengchi University alumni
Academic staff of the National Chengchi University
Taipei Members of the Legislative Yuan
Kuomintang Members of the Legislative Yuan in Taiwan
Members of the 4th Legislative Yuan
Members of the 6th Legislative Yuan
Members of the 7th Legislative Yuan
Members of the 8th Legislative Yuan
Members of the 9th Legislative Yuan
New Party Members of the Legislative Yuan
Members of the 10th Legislative Yuan